Foxmask is a fantasy novel by Juliet Marillier.  It is the second book of the Saga of the Light Isles.

Plot summary 
When Thorvald turns 18, his mother Margaret decides to tell her son the truth about his father's identity.  Upon learning that Somerled was his father, Thorvald decided to find the man.  With his friend Sam's help, Thorvald begins his journey.  Unbeknownst to the two young men, Creidhe, the daughter of Eyvind and Nessa and Thorvald's best friend, stows aboard.

When the boat becomes damaged, they land on a lost isle called the Isle of Storms. The people who live there are in a state of constant fear and distrust. A difficult journey lies ahead for Thorvald, Creidhe, and Sam who will all be needed in order to overcome the troubles of the islanders, known as the Long Knife people, and return home to their lives and their families.

References

2004 fantasy novels
2004 Australian novels
Australian fantasy novels
Tor Books books